The 2014 Austrian Darts Open was the fourth of eight PDC European Tour events on the 2014 PDC Pro Tour. The tournament took place at the Salzburgarena in Salzburg, Austria, between 20–22 June 2014. It featured a field of 48 players and £100,000 in prize money, with £20,000 going to the winner.

Vincent van der Voort won his first European Tour title by defeating Jamie Caven 6–5 in the final.

Prize money

Qualification and format
The top 16 players from the PDC ProTour Order of Merit on 29 April 2014 automatically qualified for the event. The remaining 32 places went to players from three qualifying events - 20 from the UK Qualifier (held in Wigan on 2 May), eight from the European Qualifier and four from the Host Nation Qualifier (held at the venue the day before the event started). Michael van Gerwen withdrew on the morning before his second round match against Dean Winstanley due to an ankle injury. Winstanley received a bye through to the third round.

The following players took part in the tournament:

Top 16
  Michael van Gerwen (withdrew)
  Gary Anderson (second round)  
  Brendan Dolan (third round)
  Phil Taylor  (quarter-finals)
  Dave Chisnall (second round)
  Kim Huybrechts (second round)
  Robert Thornton (third round)
  Peter Wright (semi-finals)
  Steve Beaton (third round)
  Ian White (second round)
  Mervyn King (second round)
  Jamie Caven (runner-up)
  Simon Whitlock (third round)
  Justin Pipe (second round)
  Andy Hamilton (second round)
  Wes Newton  (quarter-finals)

UK Qualifier 
  Arron Monk (first round)
  Michael Smith (second round)
  Ronnie Baxter (third round)
  William O'Connor (first round)
  Ben Ward (second round)
  Jamie Lewis (first round)
  Dean Winstanley (third round)
  Alex Roy (second round)
  Andy Smith  (quarter-finals)
  Dennis Smith (first round)
  Terry Jenkins (second round)
  David Pallett (first round)
  Kevin Dowling (first round)
  Andrew Gilding (second round)
  Stephen Bunting (third round)
  John Part (quarter-finals)
  Mark Walsh (first round)
  Barrie Bates (first round)
  John Henderson (second round)
  Mark Webster (first round)

European Qualifier
  Dirk van Duijvenbode (first round)
  Vincent van der Voort (winner)
  Bernd Roith (second round)
  Benito van de Pas (third round)
  Marko Kantele (first round)
  Max Hopp (first round)
  Christian Kist (first round)
  Salmon Renyaan (first round)

Host Nation Qualifier
  Rowby-John Rodriguez (second round)
  Uwe Bacher (first round)
  Michael Rasztovits (first round)
  Mensur Suljović (semi-finals)

Draw

References

2014 PDC European Tour
2014 in Austrian sport